The 1958 Scottish League Cup final was played on 25 October 1958 at Hampden Park in Glasgow and it was the final of the 13th Scottish League Cup competition. The final was contested by Hearts and Partick Thistle. Hearts won the match 5–1, thanks to goals by Willie Bauld, Johnny Hamilton and Jimmy Murray.

Match details

References

External links
 Soccerbase
 London Hearts

1958
League Cup Final
Heart of Midlothian F.C. matches
Partick Thistle F.C. matches
1950s in Glasgow
October 1958 sports events in the United Kingdom